Waterfoot or Glenariff is a small coastal village in County Antrim, Northern Ireland. It is at the foot of Glenariff, one of the Glens of Antrim, within the historic barony of Glenarm Lower and the civil parishes of Ardclinis and Layd. The village is in the townland of Warren. The 2001 Census recorded a population of 504 inhabitants.

The village appeared in the news in November 2010 when Peter Wilson, one of the "disappeared" of the Troubles, was found buried on its beach on 2 November 2010.

Demographics	
On Census Day 27th March 2011, in Waterfoot Settlement, considering the resident population:
 
98.85% were from the white (including Irish Traveller) ethnic group;
94.62% belong to or were brought up in the Catholic religion and 4.42% belong to or were brought up in a 'Protestant and Other Christian (including Christian related)' religion; and
12.12% indicated that they had a British national identity, 58.65% had an Irish national identity and 31.73% had a Northern Irish national identity*.

See also
List of towns and villages in Northern Ireland

References

Villages in County Antrim
Civil parish of Ardclinis
Civil parish of Layd
Moyle District Council
Beaches of Northern Ireland